Thomas Hill Hubbard (December 5, 1781 – May 21, 1857) was an American lawyer, judge and public official from Madison County, New York. A member of the Democratic-Republican party, Hubbard was twice elected as U.S. Representative from New York and was a three-time Presidential elector.

Career
Born in New Haven, Connecticut, Hubbard pursued a classical education, graduating from Yale College in 1799. In New York he studied law under John Woodworth,
was admitted to the bar in 1804, and commenced practice in Hamilton, New York.

Hubbard was Surrogate of Madison County, New York from 1806 to 1816. In 1812, he was a presidential elector voting for the DeWitt Clinton ticket.

Hubbard was elected as a Democratic-Republican to the 15th United States Congress, serving from 1817 to 1819. He was Chairman of the Committee on Expenditures in the Post Office Department. During his congressional term, he held concurrently the post of District Attorney of the Sixth District (1816–18) and of Madison County (1818–21).

Hubbard was again elected to the 17th United States Congress, serving from 1821 to 1823. Afterward he removed to Utica, the seat of Oneida County, New York. He formed a partnership with Greene C. Bronson and was later appointed Clerk of the New York Supreme Court, a position he held from 1825 to 1835.

He was one of the founders of Hamilton College and Hamilton Academy in Clinton, New York, was a trustee of Utica Free Academy and was the first president of the board of directors of the New York State Lunatic Asylum at Utica, which opened in 1843.

In 1844 and 1852, he was again a presidential elector, both times on the Democratic ticket, voting for James Knox Polk and Franklin Pierce.

Family
Thomas Hubbard died in Utica at the age of 75 and was interred in Forest Hill Cemetery in Utica.  The Hubbard family was prominent in investing and developing of the Hudson River, Michigan Southern and Northern Indiana Railroad lines from the mid-1840s through the late 1860s and, in subsequent decades, Hubbard's son, Frederick, served as Superintendent of Construction on various sections of the New York and Erie Railroad bridges, becoming assistant engineer of the Michigan Southern and Michigan Central Railroad. Hubbard's son Bela moved to Detroit, Michigan and became a noted Michigan geologist, naturalist, explorer, writer and civic leader.

Ancestry

References

External links

 
 

1781 births
1857 deaths
Politicians from New Haven, Connecticut
1812 United States presidential electors
1844 United States presidential electors
1852 United States presidential electors
Yale College alumni
Politicians from Utica, New York
County district attorneys in New York (state)
People from Hamilton, New York
New York (state) state court judges
Democratic-Republican Party members of the United States House of Representatives from New York (state)
19th-century American politicians
Lawyers from New Haven, Connecticut
19th-century American judges
19th-century American lawyers
Burials at Forest Hill Cemetery (Utica, New York)